Chimanbhai Mehta ( 3 June 1925 - 26 January 2010) was  an Indian politician. He was a Member of Parliament, representing Gujarat in the Rajya Sabha the upper house of India's Parliament .

References

Rajya Sabha members from Gujarat
Indian National Congress politicians
Janata Dal politicians
1925 births
2010 deaths